Carlos Prio-Touzet (born 5 February 1955 in Havana, Cuba), is an architect in Miami, Florida. He is the son of Carlos Prío Socarrás and Celia Rosa Touzet Masfera (born 1929).

Background
He received a Bachelor of Arts from Princeton University and a Bachelor of Architecture from the University of Miami. He has been a designer and vice president for such firms as ADD Inc, Arquitectonica, Sasaki, and Spillis Candela. He has designed buildings in Europe, Asia and the United States.

Prio-Touzet has received the Florida American Institute of Architects (AIA) Unbuilt Award of Merit 2006 and the Miami-American Institute of Architects Award of Excellence 2005. His more notable projects include The Setai Miami Beach, a 37-story condominium/hotel completed in 2004 on Miami Beach, Florida; the Vitri, a mixed use development on Miami Beach that was scheduled to be completed in 2007; Lime Tree Bay Development, a luxury residential development in the Florida Keys; and the NE 11 Street project, a 44-story residential building that was to be built in 2008 in Miami, Florida.

References

External links
 Touzet Studio Website

Additional sources
 Town & Country magazine, January 2006, Page 102
 Ocean Drive en Espaňol magazine, Fall/Winter 2005, Page 72 
 New York Living magazine, November 2005, Page 34
 Florida Inside Out magazine, March 2007, Page 66
Florida/Caribbean Architect magazine, Summer 2005, Page 34
 Ocean Drive magazine, June 2005, Page 216
Anuario Social de la Habana 1939, (Luz - Hilo S.A.) 
Libro de Oro de la Sociedad Habanera, (Editorial Lex, 1950) 
 http://www.aia.org/aiarchitect/thismonth/0401pf/0401c4members.pdf
 http://www.bizjournals.com/southflorida/stories/2005/05/02/daily11.html
 http://www.banderasnews.com/0608/nw-miamicheers.htm
 https://web.archive.org/web/20070219214436/http://www.miamisunpost.com/archives/2006/08-10-06/art%20review.htm
 https://web.archive.org/web/20070928203643/http://www.thereznikgroup.com/vitri.html
 https://web.archive.org/web/20070930105955/http://www.thecondosgroupofmiami.com/VITRI.html
 https://web.archive.org/web/20071007110638/http://www.wheretogonext.com/2006release.php?releaseID=110917

Cuban emigrants to the United States
1955 births
Living people
20th-century American architects
Architects from Miami
21st-century American architects
Arquitectonica people